The following is a timeline of key events related to Minamata disease:

References 

"Minamata Disease: The History and Measures", The Ministry of the Environment, (2002), retrieved 17 January 2007
"Minamata Disease Archives"  by the National Institute for Minamata Disease, retrieved 29 October 2006
Harada, Masazumi. (1972). Minamata Disease. Kumamoto Nichinichi Shinbun Centre & Information Center/Iwanami Shoten Publishers.  C3036
George, S. Timothy. (2001). Minamata: Pollution and the Struggle for Democracy in Postwar Japan. Harvard University Press. 
Ui, Jun. (1992). Industrial Pollution in Japan. United Nations University Press. . Chapter 4, section IV
Smith, W. E. and Smith, A. M. (1975). Minamata. Chatto & Windus, Ltd. (London),

Further reading 
Oiwa, Keibo. (2001). Rowing the Eternal Sea: The Story of a Minamata Fisherman. Rowman & Littlefield Publishers. 
Steingraber, Sandra. (2001). Having Faith: An Ecologist Journey to Motherhood. Perseus Publishing. 
Approaches to Water Pollution Control, Minamata City, Kumamoto Prefecture
Allchin, Douglas. The Poisoning of Minamata
Sung about in the Alt. group Bush's "Disease of the Dancing Cats"
Referenced as background in the 1979 horror film Prophecy
 Saito, Hisashi. (2009). Niigata Minamata Disease:  Methyl Mercury Poisoning in Niigata, Japan.  Niigata Nippo.
 Walker, Brett. (2010) "Toxic Archipelago: A History of Industrial Disease in Japan." University of Washington Press. 
Ishimure, Michiko (2003). Paradise in the Sea of Sorrow: Our Minimata Disease. Michigan Classics in Japanese Studies.

External links 
 ATSDR - ToxFAQs: Mercury - Frequently asked questions about Mercury
 National Institute for Minamata Disease 
 Minamata Disease: The History and Measures - The Ministry of the Environment's summary of Minamata disease
 Soshisha - The Supporting Center for Minamata Disease and the Minamata Disease Museum
 Aileen Archive - Copyright holder of W. Eugene Smith's Minamata photos
 Photograph by W. Eugene Smith - Tomoko Uemura in Her Bath, 1972
 Minamata disease - Chapter from Industrial Pollution in Japan by Dr Jun Ui
 Toxic Archipelago: Industrial Pollution in Japan - A talk by Brett Walker, September 16, 2010
 Minamata Timeline by Minamata City Council.

M
M
Minamata disease